Kish Olya (also Romanized as Kīsh ʿOlyā); also known as Kish Bazanvid (Persian: کيش عليا), also Romanized as Kīsh Bazanvīd) is a village in Zalaqi-ye Sharqi Rural District, Besharat District, Aligudarz County, Lorestan Province, Iran. At the 2006 census, its population was 111, in 19 families.

References 

Towns and villages in Aligudarz County